Eugen Florin Crăciun (born 22 March 1986) is a Romanian former professional footballer who played as a right back or as a right midfielder for teams such as Dinamo București, CSM Râmnicu Vâlcea, Astra Ploiești or CS Mioveni, among others.

External links

1986 births
Living people
Sportspeople from Brăila
Romanian footballers
Association football defenders
Liga I players
Liga II players
FC Dinamo București players
SCM Râmnicu Vâlcea players
FC Astra Giurgiu players
CS Mioveni players
FC Voluntari players